Kate Veale writes and illustrates children's books. She is the creator of the Mr. Moon series aired on the Playhouse Disney channel from 2010.

Background
Veale was born in Derbyshire and was consumed by drawing, painting and writing from a very early age. She was encouraged to make her own Christmas cards by artistic parents Roy and Margaret. She has two sisters (Claire and twin sister Amanda). 
Her love of the countryside and the natural world developed from long holidays staying with family friends in Somerset. The whole family would be invited to stay in an old stone farmhouse surrounded by countryside where Veale and her brothers would spend most of their time. The whole family also had a great interest in wildlife.

Education and early career
At school Veale's artistic ability was noticeable and she sold her first paintings during her school days.

She was also quite academic and passed her Oxford entrance exam before sitting her A levels. She went to Durham University but was unhappy studying history. She left Durham after one year so that she could follow her desire to paint and write.

Her first commercial studio experience was with Jay Advertising, a small studio in Leicestershire where she started as a freelance artist. Although Veale appreciated the experience she found the very commercial aspect of the work difficult to come to terms with because it restrained her imagination. However it was invaluable experience and taught her important technical and commercial aspects.

Veale also did some work for Sharpe's Classic and some nature studies for Royle Publications around this time. She was spotted by Rowland Hilder who was on the board at Royle. He had been impressed by an illustration of a rabbit with young which Veale had submitted and which was subsequently published. He gave her advice and encouragement which stayed with her through thick and thin: "whatever you do, never stop drawing and painting". He also gave her tutorial advice which helped Veale enormously.

Bibliography
Mr Moon
 2000: Mr Moon Opens the Secret Door
 2000: Mr Moon and the Ugly Alien
 2000: Mr Moon and the Blackcurrant Rain Cloud
 2000: Mr Moon Visits Earth

Oliver Otter and Friends
 1996: Did You Swim Today, Oliver Otter?
 1996: Follow the Trail, Digsby the Mole
 1996: Will Squirrel's Big Fizz
 1996: Drew the Shrew and the Star
 1996: Watch Out For Father Christmas

Country Companions
 1993: A Day in the Life of Sam Rabbit
 1993: A Day in the Life of Edward Hedgehog
 1993: A Day in the Life of Tom Mouse
 1993: A Day in the Life of Badger
 1992: What Happened to Edward Hedgehog One Winter

References

Year of birth missing (living people)
Living people
British illustrators
English children's writers